The 1961 Pacific hurricane season was an event in meteorology. It officially started on May 15, 1961, in the eastern Pacific and lasted until November 30, 1961. Ten tropical cyclones, 9 named storms (Madeline and Simone were operationally considered a tropical storm) and two hurricanes formed during the 1961 season, none of the hurricanes reached beyond category 1 status on the Saffir-Simpson Hurricane Scale.

The 1961 Pacific hurricane season featured only one notable tropical cyclone: Hurricane Tara. Tara devastated southwest Mexico, causing 436-500 fatalities, making it the fourth deadliest tropical cyclone in the Eastern Pacific basin.

Season summary

The 1961 Pacific hurricane season was slightly more active than 1960, which had eight tropical cyclones, compare with 11 during this year. However, in 1960, there were five hurricane, but only two in 1961. Although there were an abnormally high number of tropical cyclones for its time, 1961 fell below the 1995-2008 average number of tropical cyclones, which is 15 tropical cyclones, 9 hurricanes, and 4 major hurricanes. In addition, there were eleven tropical cyclones, two hurricanes, but no major hurricanes. However, in post-analysis, it was noted that "Tropical Storm Madeline" was only a tropical depression, and shouldn't have been named.

Tropical cyclone activity first began about a month after the official start of the season, with Iva developed on June 9. After Iva dissipated on June 11, there was another period of lack of tropical cyclogenesis for almost a month, ending after Tropical Storm Joanne developed on July 10. July was an active month, with four tropical cyclones developing. However, the month of August and September combined featured only two tropical cyclones. After September, there were two tropical cyclones in October, both existing only on October 3 and October 4. Two more tropical cyclones developed in November, which was the first time on record, and would not occur again until 2006.

Operationally, the San Francisco Weather Bureau issued advisories for Tropical Storm Simone, which existed in early November south of Mexico. The system originated from the remnants of Atlantic Hurricane Hattie, crossing into the basin on November 1; on the same day, the system was named Simone. The system consisted of a broad circulation with gale force winds, which the Atlantic hurricane reanalysis committee referred as a Central American gyre; as it lacked a well-defined center, the system was removed as a tropical cyclone in 2019. The gyre intensified before moving ashore Mexico on November 3, whereupon it dissipated.

Systems

Hurricane Iva

Hurricane Iva was the first storm of the season, as the Eastern Pacific continued through the name lists regardless of the year. Iva was first observed on June 9 280 mi (420.61 km/h) southwest of Puerto Ángel. The storm slowly curved northward, and Iva did not intensify past its peak with winds of 85 mph (140 km/h). By June 11, Iva made landfall near Zihuatanejo, Guerrero, Mexico at the same intensity. Iva transitioned into an extratropical cyclone less than six hours later, and the remnants completely dissipated on June 12.

Tropical Storm Joanne

Tropical Storm Joanne developed on July 10 175 mi (281.63 km) southwest of Socorro Island. Winds were at 50 mph (80 km/h) upon development, and no further intensification would occur while Joanne headed generally westward. Joanne dissipated two days later 883 mi (1421 km/h) south-southeast of Guadalupe Island.

Tropical Storm Kathleen

Tropical Storm Kathleen developed on July 14 in a similar location to Tropical Storm Joanne. Kathleen headed west-southwestward and did not intensify past 50 mph (85 km/h). By July 16, Kathleen dissipated.

Tropical Storm Liza

Tropical Storm Liza stayed at sea.

Tropical Depression  Madeline

Tropical Depression Madeline stayed at sea and downgraded during post-analysis.

Tropical Storm Naomi

Tropical Storm Naomi stayed at sea.

Tropical Storm Orla

Tropical Storm Orla came close to the Baja California Peninsula. but stayed at sea.

Tropical Storm Pauline

Tropical Storm Pauline stayed at sea.

Tropical Storm Rebecca

Tropical Storm Rebecca stayed at sea.

Hurricane Tara

Hurricane Tara was one of the deadliest Pacific hurricanes on record. It was the final storm of the season, forming on November 10 about 230 mi (365 km) off the coast of Mexico. It strengthened to reach 85 mph (140 km/h) before making landfall in the Mexican state of Guerrero near Zihuatanejo. Hurricane Tara dissipated on November 12, bringing heavy rainfall and strong winds to locations inundated by 10 days of precipitation. Damage was light in the major port city of Acapulco, though further west along the coast, the effects of Tara were much worse. The city of Nuxco in Tecpán de Galeana municipality received the most damage and deaths from the hurricane. Throughout Mexico, at least 436 fatalities were reported, and damage exceeded $16 million (1961 USD).

Storm names
The following names were used for named storms that formed in the eastern Pacific in 1961. Simone was operationally considered a tropical storm, but was removed as a tropical cyclone by the Atlantic hurricane reanalysis committee in 2019. No names were retired, and the names on this portion of list 1 were used again in the 1968 season. This is the same list as list 1 used during the 1960-1965 Pacific hurricane seasons, names that were not assigned are marked in gray.

The Central Pacific used names and numbers from the Western Pacific's typhoon list. No systems formed in the area, and thus no names were required.

See also 

 Tropical cyclone
 List of Pacific hurricanes
 1961 Atlantic hurricane season
 1961 Pacific typhoon season
 1961 North Indian Ocean cyclone season
 Australian region cyclone seasons: 1960–61 1961–62
 South Pacific cyclone seasons: 1960–61 1961–62
 South-West Indian Ocean cyclone seasons: 1960–61 1961–62

References

 
Pacific hurricane seasons
Articles which contain graphical timelines